William M. Kantor (born September 19, 1944) is an American mathematician who works in finite group theory and finite geometries, particularly in computational aspects of these subjects.

Education and career
Kantor graduated with a bachelor's degree from Brooklyn College in 1964.  He went on to graduate studies at the University of Wisconsin, receiving his PhD in 1968 under the supervision of Peter Dembowski and R. H. Bruck.  He then worked at the University of Illinois at Chicago from 1968 to 1971 before moving in 1971 to the University of Oregon, where he remained for the rest of his career.

Kantor's research mostly involves finite groups, often in relation to finite geometries and computation.  Algorithms developed by him have found use, for example, in the GAP computer algebra system.

Kantor has written over 170 papers, and has advised 7 PhD students.

Significant publications

Books and monographs

Journal articles

Awards and honors
 In 2013, Kantor was named a fellow of the American Mathematical Society as a member of the inaugural class of fellows.
 In 2004, a conference "Finite geometries, groups, and computation" was held in honor of Kantor's 60th birthday.
 In 1998, Kantor gave an invited talk at the International Congress of Mathematicians in Berlin.

References

20th-century American mathematicians
21st-century American mathematicians
Brooklyn College alumni
University of Wisconsin–Madison alumni
University of Oregon faculty
University of Illinois Chicago faculty
Fellows of the American Mathematical Society
Living people
1944 births